Jaime Sodré de França (born 7 December 1955) is a Brazilian boxer. He competed in the men's light welterweight event at the 1980 Summer Olympics. At the 1980 Summer Olympics, he lost to Tony Willis of Great Britain.

References

External links
 

1955 births
Living people
Brazilian male boxers
Olympic boxers of Brazil
Boxers at the 1980 Summer Olympics
Place of birth missing (living people)
Light-welterweight boxers